HD 63399 is an orange hued star located in the southern constellation Puppis, the poop deck. It has an apparent magnitude of 6.45, placing it near the limit for naked eye visibility. Based on parallax measurements from Gaia DR3, the object is estimated to be 445 light years distant. At its current distance, HD 63399 is diminished by 0.29 magnitudes due to interstellar dust.

HD 63399 is a red giant star that is currently on the red giant branch, fusing hydrogen in a shell around its core. It has a stellar classification of K1 III. At present it has a mass ranging from 1.3 to 1.7 times the mass of the Sun, depending on the study. The star has an iron abundance 13% below solar levels, making it slightly metal deficient.

References

Puppis
K-type giants
CD-35 03874
063399
037996